Cradle Robbers is a 1924 short silent comedy film directed by Robert F. McGowan. It was the 26th Our Gang short subject released.

Synopsis
The boys cannot go fishing because they have to take care of their baby brothers and sisters. After trying unsuccessfully to sell their babies to some traveling gypsies, Mary shows up and tells them that her little sister just won a prize at the baby show.

The boys decide to enter their babies in the show, only to discover that all the prizes are gone except the one for the fattest baby. Mickey comes up with the idea to enter Joe as a baby. After Joe escapes, the gang decides to make their own baby show. When the parents discover their babies are missing they assume that the gypsies stole them. When the gang finds out that their parents are after them, they hide in the gypsy wagon, which drives off. As the police and parents chase the wagon down the street, the babies start falling off the wagon and the parents stop and pick them up as they continue running.

The adults finally catch up with the wagon, the gypsy is arrested, and the kids reunited with their parents.

Production notes
Cradle Robbers marked the final appearance of Ernie Morrison as "Sunshine Sammy." It also marked the first appearance of Peggy Ahern.

The early scene of gang entertaining their younger siblings with fishing poles was reworked in 1933's Forgotten Babies.

When the silent Pathé ‘’Our Gang’’ comedies were syndicated for television as "The Mischief Makers" in 1960, Cradle Robbers was retitled The Baby Show. Two-thirds of the original film was included.

Cast

The Gang
 Joe Cobb — Joe
 Jackie Condon — Jackie
 Mickey Daniels — Mickey
 Allen Hoskins — Farina
 Mary Kornman — Mary
 Ernie Morrison — Sunshine Sammy
 Dick Henchen — Dick
 Sonny Loy — Sing Joy
 Pal the Dog — Himself

Additional cast
 Lassie Lou Ahern — little girl in attic
 Peggy Ahern — girl at baby show
 Jannie Hoskins — Ernie and Farina's sister 
 Gabe Saienz — boy at baby show
 Allan Cavan – police officer/baby show official
 Beth Darlington – woman with bald boyfriend
 William Gillespie – officer chasing Joe/Gypsy
 Helen Gilmore – Jackie's mother
 Clara Guiol – baby show official
 Lyle Tayo – angry mother
 Dorothy Vernon – angry mother

References

External links

1924 films
American silent short films
American black-and-white films
Films directed by Robert F. McGowan
Hal Roach Studios short films
1924 comedy films
Our Gang films
1924 short films
1920s American films
Silent American comedy films
1920s English-language films